The right of self-defense (also called, when it applies to the defense of another, alter ego defense, defense of others, defense of a third person) is the right for people to use reasonable or defensive force, for the purpose of defending one's own life (self-defense) or the lives of others, including – in certain circumstances – the use of deadly force.

If a defendant uses defensive force because of a threat of deadly or grievous harm by the other person, or a reasonable perception of such harm, the defendant is said to have a "perfect self-defense" justification. If defendant uses defensive force because of such a perception, and the perception is not reasonable, the defendant may have an "imperfect self-defense" as an excuse.

General concepts – legal theory 

The early theories make no distinction between defense of the person and defense of property. Whether consciously or not, this builds on the Roman Law principle of dominium where any attack on the members of the family or the property it owned was a personal attack on the pater familias the male head of the household, sole owner of all property belonging to the household, and endowed by law with dominion over all his descendants through the male line no matter their age. The right to self-defense is phrased as the principle of vim vi repellere licet ("it is permitted to repel force by force") in the Digest of Justitian (6th century). Another early application of this was Martin Luther's concept of justified resistance against a Beerwolf ruler, which was used in the doctrine of the lesser magistrate propounded in the 1550 Magdeburg Confession.

In Leviathan (1651), Hobbes (using the English term self-defense for the first time) proposed the foundation political theory that distinguishes between a state of nature where there is no authority and a modern state. Hobbes argues that although some may be stronger or more intelligent than others in their natural state, none are so strong as to be beyond a fear of violent death, which justifies self-defense as the highest necessity. In the Two Treatises of Government, John Locke asserts the reason why an owner would give up their autonomy:

...the enjoyment of the property he has in this state is very unsafe, very unsecure. This makes him willing to quit a condition, which, however free, is full of fears and continual dangers: and it is not without reason, that he seeks out, and is willing to join in society with others, who are already united, or have a mind to unite, for the mutual preservation of their lives, liberties and estates, which many call by the general name, property.

In earlier times before the development of national policing, an attack on the family home was effectively either an assault on the people actually inside or an indirect assault on their welfare by depriving them of shelter and/or the means of production. This linkage between a personal attack and property weakened as societies developed but the threat of violence remains a key factor. As an aspect of sovereignty, in his 1918 speech Politik als Beruf (Politics as a Vocation), Max Weber defined a state as an authority claiming the monopoly on the legitimate use of physical force within defined territorial boundaries. Recognizing that the modern framework of nations has emerged from the use of force, Weber asserted that the exercise of power through the institutions of government remained indispensable for effective government at any level which necessarily implies that self-help is limited if not excluded.

For modern theorists, the question of self-defense is one of moral authority within the nation to set the limits to obedience to the state and its laws given the pervasive dangers in a world full of weapons. In modern societies, states are increasingly delegating or privatizing their coercive powers to corporate providers of security services either to supplement or replace components within the power hierarchy. The fact that states no longer claim a monopoly to police within their borders, enhances the argument that individuals may exercise a right or privilege to use violence in their own defense. Indeed, modern libertarianism characterizes the majority of laws as intrusive to personal autonomy and, in particular, argues that the right of self-defense from coercion (including violence) is a fundamental human right, and in all cases, with no exceptions, justifies all uses of violence stemming from this right, regardless whether in defense of the person or property. In this context, note that Article 12 Universal Declaration of Human Rights states:

No one shall be subjected to arbitrary interference with his privacy, family, home or correspondence, nor to attacks upon his honour and reputation. Everyone has the right to the protection of the law against such interference or attacks.

The inclusion of defense of one's family and home recognizes the universal benefit claimed to stem from the family's peaceable possession of private property. This general approach implicitly attacks Hohfeld's focus on the correlative relationship between right and duty as an aspect of human interactiveness as opposed to rights deemed implicitly more important because they attach to a person by virtue of his or her ownership of property. Further, it follows that, in this moral balancing exercise, laws must simultaneously criminalize aggression resulting in loss or injury, but decriminalize qualitatively identical violence causing loss or injury because it is used in self-defense. As a resolution of this apparent paradox and in defiance of Hohfeld, Robert Nozick asserted that there are no positive civil rights, only rights to property and the right of autonomy. In this theory, the "acquisition principle" states that people are entitled to defend and retain all holdings acquired in a just way and the "rectification principle" requires that any violation of the first principle be repaired by returning holdings to their rightful owners as a "one time" redistribution. Hence, in default of self-defense in the first instance, any damage to property must be made good either in kind or by value. Similarly, theorists such as George Fletcher and Robert Schopp have adopted European concepts of autonomy in their liberal theories to justify the right-holder using all necessary force to defend his or her autonomy and rights. This right inverts the felicitation principle of utilitarianism with the responsive violence being the greatest good to the individual, but accurately mirrors Jeremy Bentham who saw property as the driving force to enable individuals to enhance their utilities through stable investment and trade. In liberal theory, therefore, to maximise the utility, there is no need to retreat nor use only proportionate force. The attacker is said to sacrifice legal protection when initiating the attack. In this respect, the criminal law is not the tool of a welfare state which offers a safety net for all when they are injured. Nevertheless, some limits must be recognized as where a minor initial attack simply becomes a pretext for an excessively violent response. The civil law systems have a theory of "abuse of right" to explain denial of justification in such extreme cases.

Moral theory 
The right to armed self-preservation is derived from Graeco-Roman natural rights theory, clearly enunciated by the Roman statesman Cicero (BCE 106–43) and other stoic philosophers, influenced by Aristotle.  Miguel Faria, author of the book America, Guns, and Freedom (2019), writing in Surgical Neurology International explained that individuals have a right to protect their persons via a natural right to self-defense; that people have not only a right to self-defense but also a moral duty to defend their families and neighbors; that the right to armed self-defense extends collectively to the community to curb or prevent tyrannical government.

The right of free men to bear arms for self-defense, becomes a duty to protect those under their household and care.  Most religions, especially in the Judeo-Christian heritage agree on the right to self-defense and home protection with arms. The Catholic catechism derived from  inception  based on the theological work of Thomas Aquinas.  It reads: "Legitimate defense can be not only a right but also a grave duty for one who is responsible for the lives of others. The defense of the common good requires that an unjust aggressor be rendered unable to cause harm."  Furthermore, as "it happens that the need to render the aggressor incapable of causing harm sometimes involves taking his life."

The English philosopher John Locke (1632–1704) posited that natural rights were self-evident and gave man the power "to pursue life, health, liberty and possessions," as well as the right to self-defense.  This concept was taken by the Founders of the United States and clearly formulated by Thomas Jefferson in the Declaration of Independence. Locke did not inspire Jefferson's formulation in the Declaration of Independence, "life, liberty and pursuit of happiness". Francis Hutcheson did. Cf. Arthur Herman, "How the Scots the Modern World", for an introduction, and Wikipedia's "Francis Hutcheson". In his review of David Kopel's The morality of self-defense and military action: The Judeo-Christian Tradition (2017), Faria concludes: "Liberty and the right to preserve life through self-defense are natural rights of the people – namely, gifts from God or Nature to man – and governments that attempt to circumvent those rights are no longer legitimate governments but usurpations. Bad governments and usurpations are already in rebellion against God and man, so the people have a legitimate right to self-defense in the form of insurrection to overthrow those governments."

Defense of others 

The rules are the same when force is used to protect another from danger. Generally, the defendant must have a reasonable belief that the third party is in a position where they have the right of self-defense. For example, a person who unknowingly chances upon two actors practicing a fight would be able to defend their restraint of the one that appeared to be the aggressor. However, in many jurisdictions a person who causes injury in defense of another may be liable to criminal and civil charges if such defense turned out to be unnecessary.

Legal defense for self-defense claim 
Claiming a self-defense case will greatly depend on the threat. This includes whether it was a verbal threat that made the person feel threatened, to the extent that they felt the need to defend themselves. It will also depend on if the threat was imminent or not. Some questions to ask are was the threat about to happen and was the person's life really in danger? Did they provoke the person for the attack to happen? When the person attacked the person, did his or her self-defense match the threat, or was it to the point where the person ended up dead when they did not need to have been killed? Was it a 'castle doctrine' defense? Did they intentionally break in the person's home and try to harm the person or their family to the point where they had to defend themselves or others using deadly force?

Model Penal Code
In the US, Model Penal Code §3.04 contains an elaborate formulation for use of force, including when it is justified, and limitations on the justification. The MPC is neither static nor legally binding in any jurisdiction, however more than half of all U.S. states have enacted criminal codes that borrow heavily from the MPC. In general the MPC hold great sway in criminal courts even in states that have not directly drawn from it, as judges often use the MPC as a source of the doctrines and principles underlying criminal liability. However this is not the case with regards to the law on self-defense; the MPC's definition has been resoundingly rejected by both courts and legislatures, with only a handful of jurisdictions applying the MPC's definition of self defense. In the U.S., most states apply instead the stand your ground doctrine of self-defense; whereby an otherwise law abiding individual, while in any location they have a legal right to be, enjoys an extremely broad right to self-defense, being under no legal obligation to retreat from an agressor regardless of ease or ability to do so.

Common law cases
In People v. La Voie, Supreme Court of Colorado, 395 P.2d 1001 (1964), The court wrote, "When a person has reasonable grounds for believing, and does in fact actually believe, that danger of his being killed, or of receiving great bodily harm, is imminent, he may act on such appearances and defend himself, even to the extent of taking human life when necessary, although it may turn out that the appearances were false, or although he may have been mistaken as to the extent of the real actual danger."

Definition in specific countries 
 Australia
 Czech Republic
 Sweden
 England and Wales
 United States

See also 
 Justifiable homicide
 Overview of gun laws by nation
 Pikuach nefesh
 Right to keep and bear arms
 Son assault demesne
 Use of force continuum

References

Bibliography
 
 Sir Edward Coke, The First Part of the Institutes of the Laws of England, or, A Commentary on Littleton (London, 1628, ed. F. Hargrave and C. Butler, 19th ed., London, 1832)
 Dressler, Joshua, New Thoughts About the Concept of Justification in the Criminal Law: A Critique of Fletcher's Thinking and Rethinking, (1984) 32 UCLA L. Rev. 61.
 Fletcher, George P. (1990) Crime of Self-Defense: Bernhard Goetz and the Law on Trial, Chicago: University of Chicago Press, .
 Fletcher, George P. (2000) Rethinking Criminal Law, Oxford: Oxford University Press, .
 
 
 
 
 
 
 Schopp, Robert F. (1998) Justification Defenses and Just Convictions, Cambridge: Cambridge University Press, .
 
 Semeraro, (2006)  Osservazioni sulla riforma della legittima difesa
 Vitu, Legitime defense et infraction d'imprudence, Revue de Science Criminelle, 1987, 865.

External links 
 UseofForce.us, an independent, in-depth breakdown of US self-defense legalities.
 

Human rights
Self-defense